Ground frost refers to the various coverings of ice produced by the direct deposition of water vapor on objects and trees, whose surfaces have a temperature below the freezing point of water (0 °C, 32 °F).

Types 
The three main types of ground frost are radiation frost (hoar frost), advection frost (advection hoar frost) and evaporation frost. The latter is a rare type which occurs when surface moisture evaporates into drier air causing its temperature at the surface to fall at or under the freezing point of water. Rime (both soft and hard) is technically not a type of ground frost.

Alternative definition 

Ground frost may also refer to the condition when the temperature of the upper layer of the soil falls below the freezing point of water.

In England 
From 1906 to 1960 the Met Office practice was to base the number of days of ground frost on this criterion: a day with a minimum temperature reaching 30 °F (−1 °C), probably because 32 °F (0 °C) was not considered enough cold to cause damage to growing plants. Since 1961 the statistics have referred to the number of days with grass minimum temperature below 0°C. Occasionally, the term ground frost can still be seen, but it means simply a minimum temperature below 0 °C.

See also 
Frost
Frost (temperature)

References 

Snow or ice weather phenomena